The Black Powder class is a class of Submarine and Special Warfare Support Vessels under the United States Navy.

Development 
All 4 ships were owned by Hornbeck Offshore Services from 2009 but in 2015, the United States Navy purchased all ships and redesignated them. They are named Black Powder, Westwind, Eagleview and Arrowhead.

Ships in class

References

External links
 Navsource

 
Auxiliary ships of the United States Navy
Auxiliary ship classes of the United States Navy